Eder Frayre Moctezuma (born 29 October 1991) is an Olympic athlete and professional Mexican cyclist, who currently rides for UCI Continental team .

Major results
2013
 1st  Road race, National Under-23 Road Championships
2014
 National Road Championships
2nd Road race
4th Time trial
2016
 3rd Road race, National Road Championships
 4th Road race, Pan American Road Championships
2018
 6th Overall Tour de Taiwan
2019
 1st Stage 3 Tour of Southland
 3rd Overall Redlands Bicycle Classic
 8th Overall Tour of the Gila
2021
 1st  Road race, National Road Championships

References

External links
 

1991 births
Living people
Mexican male cyclists
People from Ensenada, Baja California
Olympic cyclists of Mexico
Cyclists at the 2020 Summer Olympics